Elin Ann-Sofi Pettersson-Colling (later Saltin; born 1 January 1932) is a retired Swedish gymnast. She competed at the 1952 and 1956 Summer Olympics and won a gold and a silver medal in the obsolete event team portable apparatus. In 1956, she also won a bronze on the vault, the only Swedish gymnast to win an individual Olympic medal.

Pettersson was the national champion in 1951 to 1958 and sportswoman of the year in 1955. She later married Bengt Saltin, a sports scientist, and worked as a doctor.

References

External links

1932 births
Living people
Sportspeople from Stockholm
Swedish female artistic gymnasts
Gymnasts at the 1952 Summer Olympics
Gymnasts at the 1956 Summer Olympics
Olympic gymnasts of Sweden
Olympic gold medalists for Sweden
Olympic silver medalists for Sweden
Olympic bronze medalists for Sweden
Olympic medalists in gymnastics
Medalists at the World Artistic Gymnastics Championships
Medalists at the 1956 Summer Olympics
Medalists at the 1952 Summer Olympics
20th-century Swedish women